Alan Bernard (January 30, 1934 – December 11, 2011) was an American sound engineer. Born in Windsor, Ontario. He won five Primetime Emmy Awards and was nominated for eight more in the category Outstanding Sound Mixing for his work on the television programs The Winds of War, Crime Story, Star Trek: The Next Generation, Star Trek: Voyager and also the television films The Savage Bees, Having Babies II, Baby Comes Home and The Jesse Owens Story. 

Bernard died in December 2011 in Los Angeles, California, at the age of 77.

References

External links 

1934 births
2011 deaths
American audio engineers
Canadian audio engineers
Canadian emigrants to the United States
People from Windsor, Ontario
Primetime Emmy Award winners
20th-century American engineers